This page lists Japan-related articles with romanized titles beginning with the letter G. For names of people, please list by surname (i.e., "Tarō Yamada" should be listed under "Y", not "T"). Please also ignore particles (e.g. "a", "an", "the") when listing articles (i.e., "A City with No People" should be listed above "County").

G
G Gundam
G-men (magazine)
G-Saviour

Ga
Gackt
Guadalcanal campaign
Gagaku
Gaijin
Gainax
Gakkō no Kaidan
Gakushuin
Galaxy Express 999
Galcian
Gallery Fake
Gamagori, Aichi
Game Boy
Game Boy Advance
Game Boy Camera
Game Boy Micro
Game Boy Printer
Game Freak
Gamera
Ganguro
Ganon / Ganondorf
Gantzs

Ge
Gecko
Geihoku, Hiroshima
Geino, Mie
Geinoh Yamashirogumi
Geisei, Kōchi
Geisha
Gekiga
Gekigangar III
Genbukan
Gendai Budō
Genichi Taguchi
Genichi Kawakami
Genji monogatari (opera)
Genjo Sanzo
Genkai, Saga
Genmaicha
Genpei War
Genrō
Gensomaden Saiyuki
Geography of Japan
Gero, Gifu
The Gerogerigegege
Geta (footwear)

Gh
Ghidorah, the Three-Headed Monster
Ghost in the Shell
Ghost in the Shell 2: Innocence
Ghost in the Shell: Stand Alone Complex
Ghouls 'n Ghosts

Gi
Gichin Funakoshi
Gifu Castle
Gifu Prefecture
Gifu, Gifu
Giko Cat
Ginan, Gifu
Ginkgo biloba
Ginowan, Okinawa
Ginoza, Okinawa
Ginza

Gl
GLAY
Glitch City
Glutinous rice

Go
Go (2001 film)
Go (board game)
Go players
Go professional
Go proverb
Go Seigen
Go strategy and tactics
Go terms
Gobō
Gobo, Wakayama
Godzilla
Godzilla (1954)
Godzilla Raids Again
Godzilla vs. Biollante
Godzilla vs. Gigan
Godzilla vs. Hedorah
Godzilla vs. Mechagodzilla
Godzilla vs. Mothra
Godzilla vs. the Sea Monster
Godzilla vs The Thing
Godzilla, King of the Monsters!
Godzilla's Revenge
Gohoku, Kochi
Gojo, Nara
Gojūon
Gojū Ryū
Goka, Shimane
Gokase, Miyazaki
Gokasho, Shiga
Gokenin
Gokinjo Monogatari
Goku Junior
Gold Roger
Golden Light Sutra
Golden Week (Japan)
Gomashio
Gomoku
Goroawase
Goseibai Shikimoku
Gosen, Niigata
Goshiki, Hyogo
Heinosuke Gosho
Goshogawara, Aomori
Goshoura, Kumamoto
Gospellers
Gotanda Station
Gotenba, Shizuoka
Gotenks
Gothic Lolita
Gotō Islands
Gotsu, Shimane

Gr
Gradius
The Grand Line
Grave of the Fireflies
Gravitation (anime)
Great Hanshin earthquake
Great Kantō earthquake
Great Teacher Onizuka
Greater East Asia War
Greater East Asia War in the Pacific
Greater Tokyo Area
Green tea
Greenery Day
Ground zero

Gu
Guan Yin
Guandong army
Guile (video game character)
Guineapig films
Gujo, Gifu
Gundam
Gundam - The 08th MS Team
Gundam 0080
Gundam 0083
Gundam F-91
Gundam Seed
Gundam Wing
Gundam Wing - Endless Waltz
Gundam X
Gungrave
Gunma Prefecture
Gushikami, Okinawa
Gushikawa Castle (Itoman)
Gushikawa, Okinawa
Gusukube, Okinawa

Gy
Gyaru-moji
Gyoda, Saitama
Gyokuon-hōsō
Gyokuro
Gyokuto, Kumamoto
Gyoza
Gyūdon

G